Mavrič is a Slovenian surname. Notable people with the surname include:

Borut Mavrič (born 1970), Slovenian football player
Matej Mavrič (born 1979), Slovenian football player
Vita Mavrič, Slovenian female chansonnier

Slovene-language surnames